Lauren Hill (or similar) is the name of:

Lauryn Hill (born 1975), American hip hop singer
Lauren Michelle Hill (born 1979), February 2001 Playboy Playmate of the Month
Lauren Hill (basketball) (1995–2015), American college basketball player and cancer research activist
Loren Hill, songwriter on Dance for Me
Lauren Hill (figure skater) in 1999 United States Figure Skating Championships
Lauren Hill (soccer) on Michigan Hawks

See also
LaurenHill Academy
Laurens Hill, Georgia, a community in the United States
Laurie Hill (disambiguation)